The Commissioner of Patents may refer to:
 Commissioner of Patents (Australia)
 Commissioner of Patents (Canada)
 Commissioner for Patents (US) who oversees the United States Patent and Trademark Office and reports to the Under Secretary of Commerce for Intellectual Property
 List of people who have headed the United States Patent Office

See also 
 List of patent offices